In Christian theology, baptism with the Holy Spirit, also called baptism in the Holy Spirit or baptism in the Holy Ghost, has been interpreted by different Christian denominations and traditions in a variety of ways due to differences in the doctrines of salvation and ecclesiology. It is frequently associated with incorporation into the Christian Church, the bestowal of spiritual gifts, and empowerment for Christian ministry. Spirit baptism has been variously defined as part of the sacraments of initiation into the church, as being synonymous with regeneration, as being synonymous with Christian perfection that empowers a person for Christian life and service. The term baptism with the Holy Spirit originates in the New Testament, and all Christian traditions accept it as a theological concept.

Prior to the 18th century, most denominations believed that Christians received the baptism with the Holy Spirit either upon conversion and regeneration or through rites of Christian initiation, such as water baptism and confirmation. Emerging in the mid-18th century, Methodism (inclusive of the holiness movement) affirms the possibility of entire sanctification as a second work of grace, which it teaches is the baptism of the Holy Spirit. In the 20th century that saw the spread of Pentecostal churches, which identified baptism of the Holy Spirit with glossolalia, the belief that this is an experience distinct from Christian initiation has come into increasing prominence.

Biblical description

Old Covenant background

In Christian theology, the work of the Holy Spirit under the Old Covenant is viewed as less extensive than that under the New Covenant inaugurated on the day of Pentecost. The Spirit was restricted to certain chosen individuals, such as high priests and prophets. Often termed the "spirit of prophecy" in rabbinic writings, the Holy Spirit was closely associated with prophecy and divine inspiration. It was anticipated that in the future messianic age God would pour out his spirit upon all of Israel, which would become a nation of prophets.

Canonical gospels
While the exact phrase "baptism with the Holy Spirit" is not found in the New Testament, two forms of the phrase are found in the canonical gospels using the verb "baptize", from the Greek word  meaning to "immerse" or "plunge". The baptism was spoken about by John the Baptist, who contrasted his water baptism for the forgiveness of sins with the baptism of Jesus. In Mark 1 and John 1, the Baptist proclaimed that Jesus "will baptize in (the) Holy Spirit"; while in Matthew 3 and Luke 3, he "will baptize with Holy Spirit and fire".

Jesus is considered the first person to receive the baptism with the Holy Spirit. The Holy Spirit descended on Jesus during his baptism and anointed him with power. Afterward, Jesus began his ministry and displayed his power by casting out demons, healing the sick, and teaching with authority.

Acts of the Apostles

The phrase "baptized in the Holy Spirit" occurs two times in Acts of the Apostles, first in Acts 1:4–5 and second in Acts 11:16. Other terminology is used in Acts to indicate Spirit baptism, such as "filled". "Baptized in the Spirit" indicates an outward immersion into the reality of the Holy Spirit, while "filled with the Spirit" suggests an internal diffusion. Both terms speak to the totality of receiving the Spirit.  The baptism with the Holy Spirit is described in various places as the Spirit "poured out upon", "falling upon", "coming upon" people. To "pour out" suggests abundance and reflects John 3:34, "God gives the Spirit without limit". Another expression, "come upon" is related to a statement by Jesus in Luke 24:49, "I am sending the promise of my Father upon you. But stay in the city until you are clothed with power from on high". The language of "come on" and "clothed with" suggest possession by and endowment with the Holy Spirit.

The narrative of Acts begins after Jesus' crucifixion and resurrection. The resurrected Jesus directed his disciples to wait in Jerusalem for the baptism in the Holy Spirit and promised, "you will receive power when the Holy Spirit has come upon you, and you will be my witnesses in Jerusalem and in all Judea and Samaria, and to the end of the earth". After his ascension, he was given authority to pour out the Holy Spirit.

In the New Testament, the messianic expectations found in early Judaism were fulfilled on the day of Pentecost as recorded in Acts. The Christian community was gathered together in Jerusalem when a sound from heaven like rushing wind was heard and tongues like tongues of flame rested on everyone. They were filled with the Holy Spirit and began to speak in tongues, miraculously praising God in foreign languages. A crowd gathered and was addressed by the Apostle Peter who stated that the occurrence was the fulfillment of the prophecy of Joel 2, "And in the last days it shall be, God declares, that I will pour out my Spirit on all flesh, and your sons and your daughters shall prophesy". He then explained how the Spirit came to be poured out, recounting Jesus' ministry and passion and then proclaiming his resurrection and enthronement at the right hand of God. In response, the crowd asked Peter what they should do. He responded that they should repent and be baptized for the forgiveness of sins in order to receive the gift of the Holy Spirit. Peter finished his speech stating that the promise "is for you and for your children and for all who are far off, everyone whom the Lord our God calls to himself".

Baptism in the Holy Spirit occurs elsewhere in Acts. The gospel had been proclaimed in Samaria and the apostles Peter and John were sent from Jerusalem. The new believers had been baptized in water, but the Holy Spirit had not yet fallen on them. The Samaritans received the Holy Spirit when Peter and John laid their hands on them. The Apostle Paul was also filled with the Holy Spirit when Ananias of Damascus laid hands on him, and afterwards Paul was baptized with water.

Later in Acts, Peter preached the gospel to the household of Cornelius the Centurion, a gentile. While he preached, the Holy Spirit fell on the gentiles, and they began to speak in tongues. The Jewish believers with Peter were amazed, and the household was water baptized. While the apostle Paul was in Ephesus, he found disciples there and discovered that they did not know of the existence of the Holy Spirit and had only received John the Baptist's baptism. After baptizing them in Jesus' name, Paul laid his hands on them, and they began to speak in tongues and prophesy.

History

Early Christianity
In the early Church, the laying on of hands on the newly baptized to impart the gift of the Holy Spirit was the origin of the sacrament of confirmation. In the Eastern church, confirmation continued to be celebrated immediately after water baptism. The two rites were separated in the Western church. According to Pentecostal historian H. Vinson Synan, "the basic premise of Pentecostalism, that one may receive later effusions of the Spirit after initiation/conversion, can be clearly traced in Christian history to the beginnings of the rite of confirmation in the Western churches".

Reformation era and Puritanism (16th and 17th centuries)
Huldrych Zwingli, a leading Protestant Reformer in Switzerland, taught three distinct baptisms: water baptism, teaching baptism (having been educated about the Christian religion) and Spirit baptism. While full baptism included all three, Zwingli emphasized that the external baptisms of water and teaching could not provide salvation. The inner baptism of the Spirit alone could save because it conferred faith. According to Zwingli, the three baptisms could be given separately; Spirit baptism could occur first or last in the sequence.

Many Puritans believed that the conversion experience was followed by a later and distinct experience of the Holy Spirit. This experience was characterized by receiving assurance of one's salvation. English Puritan Thomas Goodwin equated this experience with the baptism in the Holy Spirit and the "seal of the Spirit" referenced in Ephesians 1.

Early Methodism and the Holiness Movement (18th and 19th centuries)

Synan traces the influence of Catholic and Anglican mystical traditions on John Wesley's doctrine of Christian perfection or entire sanctification, from which Pentecostal beliefs on Spirit baptism developed. Furthermore, theologian James Dunn notes early Methodist beliefs can be directly linked to Puritan teaching on the Holy Spirit.

Wesley taught that while the new birth was the start of the Christian life, but "inbred sin" remained and must be removed through Christian perfection, which he stated had instantaneous and gradual aspects. John Fletcher, Wesley's designated successor, called Christian perfection a "baptism in the Holy Spirit". On the subject, Fletcher wrote:

In mid-19th century America, the Wesleyan holiness movement that had adherents both within and outside mainline Methodism began to teach that entire sanctification was less a process and emphasized the instantaneous aspect of Wesley's doctrine, which one entered into by faith at a definite moment in time. This second blessing (or second work of grace), as it was commonly called, allowed Christians to be freed from the power of sin. Among adherents of the holiness movement, baptism in the Holy Spirit was synonymous with second blessing sanctification.

John  Wesley's Checks to Antinomianism later became a standard for Pentecostally-inclined holiness teachers.

Keswick higher life movement (19th century)
After his conversion in 1821, Presbyterian minister and revivalist Charles Grandison Finney experienced what he called "baptism in the Holy Spirit" accompanied by "unutterable gushings" of praise. Finney and other Reformed writers, known as Oberlin perfectionists, agreed that there was a life altering experience after conversion, but unlike their Wesleyan holiness counterparts, they conceived of it as an ongoing process enabling believers to devote themselves wholly to Christ's service. Similarly, the English Higher Life movement taught that the second blessing was an "enduement of power". According to this view, Spirit baptism gave Christians the ability to be witnesses for the gospel and to perform Christian service. Wesleyan teachers emphasized purity while Oberlin and higher life advocates stressed power as the defining outcome of Spirit baptism.

20th century
In the early 1890s, R.C. Horner, a Canadian holiness evangelist, introduced a theological distinction that would be important for the development of Pentecostalism. He argued in his books Pentecost (1891) and Bible Doctrines (1909) that the baptism in the Holy Spirit was not synonymous with the second blessing but was actually a third work of grace subsequent to salvation and sanctification that empowered the believer for service. Charles Fox Parham would build on this doctrinal foundation when he identified speaking in tongues as the Bible evidence of Spirit baptism.

Views

The diverse views on Spirit-baptism held among Christian traditions can be categorized into three main groups. These are baptism with the Spirit as sacramental initiation (Orthodox and Catholic churches), regeneration (Reformed tradition), and empowerment for witness and vocation (Pentecostals and charismatics).

Sacramental initiation

Eastern Orthodoxy

Eastern Orthodox Churches believe that baptism in the Holy Spirit is conferred with water baptism. The individual is anointed with oil (chrism) immediately after baptism. According to Cyril of Jerusalem:

Catholicism

The Catholic Church teaches that baptism, confirmation, and the Eucharist—the sacraments of Christian initiation—lay the foundations of the Christian life. The Christian life is based on baptism. It is "the gateway to life in the Spirit" and "signifies and actually brings about the birth of water and the Spirit". The post-baptismal anointing (Chrismation in the Eastern churches) signifies the gift of the Holy Spirit and announces a second anointing to be conferred later in confirmation that completes the baptismal anointing.

Confirmation, then, is necessary for the completion of baptismal grace. When confirmed, Catholics receive the "special outpouring of the Holy Spirit as once granted to the apostles on the day of Pentecost". For the confirmand it increases the seven gifts of the Holy Spirit (wisdom, understanding, counsel, fortitude, knowledge, piety, and fear of the Lord), unites more fully to Christ and the Church, and gives strength to confess Christ and defend the faith. The rite of confirmation orients toward mission, and many liturgical texts remind the initiate that the gift of the Holy Spirit should be used for service to the church and the world.

Those in the charismatic movement, including the Catholic Charismatic Renewal, teach an experiential baptism of the Holy Spirit similar to Pentecostals, defining it as the "sovereign action of God, which usually occurs when someone with a disposition of surrender and docility, prays for a fresh outpouring of the Holy Spirit in his or her life." The consensus of Catholic theologians teach that this "baptism in the Holy Spirit unleashes the Holy Spirit that is already present within us, by revitalizing the graces we received in the sacrament of Baptism." At the same time, "Baptism in the Spirit doesn't only re-ignite the graces already given to Christians through the Sacraments – it's also a new, fresh experience of the Holy Spirit which equips and inspires the individual for service, for mission, for discipleship and for life." Rev. Brenton Cordeiro teaches that those who have received Baptism with the Holy Spirit "testify that the experience brought them to a new awareness of the reality and presence of Jesus Christ in their lives [as well as] a new hunger for the Word of God, the Sacraments and were filled with a renewed desire for holiness."

Irvingism
The New Apostolic Church, an Irvingian Church, believes that baptism in the Holy Spirit is a second step after the Holy Baptism with water. It also referred to as the Holy Sealing. It is a sacrament through which the believer, through the laying on of hands and the prayer of an apostle, receives the gift of the Holy Spirit. The death out of water and spirit, which was begun in the Holy Baptism with water, is completed through the Holy Sealing.

Regeneration

The main position on Spirit baptism among the Reformed churches, dispensationalists, and many Baptists is that the baptism with the Holy Spirit occurs simultaneously with regeneration, when those who have faith in Jesus Christ receive the Holy Spirit and are incorporated into the body of Christ.

Sanctification

Methodism (inclusive of the holiness movement)

Within Methodism (inclusive of the holiness movement), baptism with the Holy Spirit has often been linked to living a sanctified life. The United Methodist Church has a sacramental view of baptism and confirmation, in which the believer receives and is strengthened by the Holy Spirit, respectively. At the same time, the United Methodist Confession of Faith affirms Wesley's doctrine of Christian perfection (also known as entire sanctification), the second work of grace:

In holiness movement within mainline Methodism and outside of it, entire sanctification is emphasized as a definite experience linked to baptism with the Holy Spirit:

According to the Articles of Faith of the Church of the Nazarene, sanctification is a work of God after regeneration "which transforms believers into the likeness of Christ" and is made possible by "initial sanctification" (which occurs simultaneously with regeneration and justification), entire sanctification, and "the continued perfecting work of the Holy Spirit culminating in glorification". Entire sanctification (as opposed to initial sanctification) is an act of God in which a believer is made free from original sin and able to devote themselves entirely to God:

As baptism with the Holy Spirit is synonymous with Entire Sanctification in Methodism, some Methodist connexions who have not allowed for the charismatic movement, such as the Immanuel Missionary Church, condemn the Pentecostal doctrine:

Empowerment

Classical Pentecostalism

In classical Pentecostalism, the baptism with the Holy Spirit is understood to be a separate and distinct experience occurring sometime after regeneration. Influenced by the Holiness movement, baptism with the Holy Spirit was regarded by the first Pentecostals as being the third work of grace, following the new birth (first work of grace) and entire sanctification (second work of grace). Baptism with the Holy Spirit is an empowering experience, equipping Spirit-filled believers for witness and ministry. Extending from this is the belief that all the spiritual gifts mentioned in the New Testament are to be sought and exercised to build up the church. Pentecostals believe that Spirit baptism will be accompanied by the physical evidence of speaking in tongues (glossolalia).

According to Pentecostal biblical interpretation, the Gospel of John 20:22 shows that the disciples of Jesus were already born again before the Holy Spirit fell at Pentecost. They then cite biblical examples in the Book of Acts 2, 8, 10, and 19 to show that it was common in the New Testament for Spirit baptism to occur after conversion. In following the biblical pattern, they argue, Christians today should also pray for this baptism which results in greater power for ministry and witness.

On the subject of Spirit baptism, Donald Gee wrote of the Christians on the Day of Pentecost:

In Pentecostal experience, Spirit baptism can be quite dramatic, as shown by William Durham's account of his Spirit baptism:

In some accounts of Spirit baptism, Pentecostals report receiving visions, such as the account of Lucy Leatherman, an Azusa Street participant:

Charismatic movement

The charismatic movement is an interdenominational revival that has affected the mainstream denominations of Christianity, including Lutheranism, Catholicism, Moravianism, Anglicanism, Methodism, and Reformed Christianity, among others. They are distinguished from Pentecostals because they tend to allow for differing viewpoints on whether Spirit baptism is subsequent to conversion and whether tongues is always a sign of receiving the baptism.

The Catholic Charismatic Renewal believes that there is a further experience of empowerment with the Holy Spirit. The Rev. Brenton Cordeiro states that Baptism with the Holy Spirit is the "sovereign action of God, which usually occurs when someone with a disposition of surrender and docility, prays for a fresh outpouring of the Holy Spirit in his or her life." As stated by Rev. Fr. Raniero Cantalamessa, "baptism in the Spirit is not a sacrament, but it is related to a sacrament[...] to the sacraments of Christian initiation. The baptism in the Spirit makes real and in a way renews Christian initiation". The consensus of Catholic theologians teach that "baptism in the Holy Spirit unleashes the Holy Spirit that is already present within us, by revitalizing the graces we received in the sacrament of Baptism." At the same time, "Baptism in the Spirit doesn't only re-ignite the graces already given to Christians through the Sacraments – it's also a new, fresh experience of the Holy Spirit which equips and inspires the individual for service, for mission, for discipleship and for life." Rev. Brenton Cordeiro teaches that those who have received Baptism with the Holy Spirit "testify that the experience brought them to a new awareness of the reality and presence of Jesus Christ in their lives [as well as] a new hunger for the Word of God, the Sacraments and were filled with a renewed desire for holiness."

Neo-charismatic movement
During the 1980s, another renewal movement emerged called the "Third Wave of the Holy Spirit" (the first wave was Pentecostalism and the second wave was the charismatic movement). Third wave charismatics stress that the preaching of the gospel, following the New Testament pattern, should be accompanied by "signs, wonders, and miracles". They believe that all Christians are baptized with the Holy Spirit at conversion, and prefer to call subsequent experiences as "filling" with the Holy Spirit. John Wimber and the Vineyard churches are most prominently associated with this label.

Mormonism

In the Latter Day Saint movement, the "baptism of fire and of the Holy Ghost" refers to the experience of one who undergoes the ordinance of confirmation with the laying on of hands to receive the gift of the Holy Ghost. It follows baptism in water and is essential to salvation. The gift of the Holy Ghost is the privilege of receiving inspiration, divine manifestations, direction, spiritual gifts, and other blessings from the Holy Spirit (see Gifts of the Spirit in Mormonism). It begins the lifetime process of sanctification.

Bible references
 Matthew 3:11: "He will baptize you with the Holy Spirit"
 Mark 1:8: "He will baptize you with the Holy Spirit"
 Luke 3:16: "He will baptize you with the Holy Spirit"
 Luke 3:22: "and the Holy Spirit descended upon him in bodily form like a dove."
 Luke 11:13: "how much more will the heavenly Father give the Holy Spirit to those who ask him!"
 Luke 24:49: "stay here in the city until you have been clothed with power from on high." (see fulfillment in Acts 2)
 John 1:33: "the one who baptizes with the Holy Spirit."
 Acts 1:4–5: "the Promise of the Father"; "you will be baptized with the Holy Spirit"
 Acts 2:1–4: "All of them were filled with the Holy Spirit and began to speak in other languages"
 Acts 2:14–18: "I will pour out my Spirit" (quoting Joel 2:28–29).
 Acts 4:31: "they were all filled with the Holy Spirit"
 Acts 8:14–17: "prayed for them that they might receive the Holy Spirit"; "as yet the Spirit had not yet come upon any of them"; "they received the Holy Spirit"; "the Spirit was given through the laying on of the apostles' hands"
 Acts 9:17: "Jesus[...] has sent me[...] that you may[...] be filled with the Holy Spirit."
 Acts 10:44–48: "The Holy Spirit fell upon all who heard the word"; "the gift of the Holy Spirit had been poured out"; "people who have received the Holy Spirit"
 Acts 11:15–16: "the Spirit fell upon them"; "you will be baptized with the Holy Spirit"
 Acts 15:8: "God[...] testified to them by giving them the Holy Spirit, just as he did to us"
 Acts 19:1–6: "Did you receive the Holy Spirit[...]?"; "the Holy Spirit came upon them, and they spoke in tongues and prophesied"
 1 Corinthians 12:13: "For in one Spirit we were all baptized into one body—Jews or Greeks, slaves or free"
 Galatians 3:2: "Did you receive the Spirit[...] by believing what you heard?"
 Ephesians 1:13: "marked with the seal of the promised Holy Spirit"

See also

 Baptism by fire
 Consolamentum
 Protestant theologies
 Spirit possession

Notes

References
 .
 .
 
 
 
   (English translation of the Catechism of the Catholic Church: Modifications from the Editio Typica.)
 
 
 
 
 
 .
 
 
 
 
 
 
 .
 
 
 .

Further reading
 Hayford, Jack W. Baptism with the Holy Spirit. Chosen, May 1, 2004. . Written from a Pentecostal perspective.
 Montague, George T. Holy Spirit, Make Your Home in Me: Biblical Meditations on Receiving the Gift of the Spirit. Word Among Us Press, February 2008. . Written from a Catholic charismatic perspective.
 Phillips, Ron. An Essential Guide to Baptism in the Holy Spirit: Foundations on the Holy Spirit Book 1. Charisma House, June 7, 2011. . Written by a charismatic Southern Baptist pastor.
 Torrey, R.A. The Baptism With The Holy Spirit. Kessinger Publishing, LLC, September 10, 2010 (originally published in 1895). . While evangelical pastor R.A. Torrey distanced himself from the Pentecostal movement, he did believe the baptism with the Holy Spirit was a second work of grace.
 Yun, Koo Dong. Baptism in the Holy Spirit: An Ecumenical Theology of Spirit Baptism. University Press of America, 2003. . The author analyzes nine different theologians' views on Spirit baptism from various Christian traditions (Roman Catholic, Lutheran, Dispensational, Pentecostal, and Reformed).

External links
 Assemblies of God Core Doctrines—Baptism in the Holy Spirit
 John Piper, "This Is He Who Baptizes with the Holy Spirit"
 "Baptism with the Holy Spirit" discussed from the non-Pentecostal/charismatic point of view

Baptism
Charismatic and Pentecostal Christianity
Pneumatology
Christian terminology
New Testament words and phrases
Evangelical theology
Holy Spirit